Vimbodí i Poblet is a municipality in the comarca of the Conca de Barberà in Catalonia, Spain. The main settlement is the village of Vimbodí.

The Prades Mountains are located in the vicinity of this municipality.

Sights 
The Monastery of Santa Maria de Poblet is a Cistercian monastery founded in 1151, and has been a UNESCO World Heritage Site since 1991.

References

External links

 Government data pages 

Municipalities in Conca de Barberà